Susan Lawley  (born 14 July 1946) is a retired English television and radio broadcaster. Her main broadcasting background involved television news and current affairs. From 1988–2006, Lawley was the presenter of Desert Island Discs on BBC Radio 4.

Early life and education
Sue Lawley was born at Sedgley, near Dudley, in July 1946, and was a pupil at Dudley Girls High School. She studied modern languages at the University of Bristol, where she dropped her Dudley accent in favour of received pronunciation.

Career 
She began her professional career as a trainee reporter on the Western Mail and South Wales Echo between 1967 and 1970, during which time she shared a house in Cardiff with Michael Buerk. She then moved to BBC Plymouth as a subeditor and freelance reporter from 1970 until 1972. In 1972, she worked as a sound recordist and then gained prominence as one of the reporters/presenters of BBC TV's news magazine Nationwide. She appeared on the show until 1975, when she was offered the main anchor role on the nightly news show Tonight.

In 1974, Lawley was part of the BBC's Election Team for the October General Election and in 1979, anchored the morning election results show the day after the General Election night broadcast. When Sir Robin Day suffered a heart attack, Lawley sat in for him as the chair of the topical discussion programme Question Time for several editions. In later years, Fiona Bruce was credited with being the first woman to host Question Time and the first woman as part of the BBC's Election Night team, when in fact Lawley had performed both roles many years before Bruce.

Lawley left Tonight on maternity leave in 1978, being replaced by Valerie Singleton, and after her maternity leave, rejoined Nationwide as one of the two main anchors, alongside Frank Bough. Lawley remained with the show until it came to a close in 1983.

During an interview with the Carpenters on Nationwide in 1981 she surprised Karen Carpenter by asking her directly about her anorexia, an eating disorder which contributed to her death in February 1983.

After Nationwide, Lawley became the anchor of the Nine O'Clock News bulletin on BBC1, and then moved to the newly launched Six O'Clock News in 1984. Lawley was praised after a broadcast on 23 May 1988, when the studio was invaded by protesters opposed to Section 28: she continued to read the news whilst co-presenter Nicholas Witchell restrained one of them.

Guest appearances and Desert Island Discs 
In 1981, she made a guest appearance in the Yes Minister episode "The Quality of Life", playing herself. Throughout the 1980s and into the early 1990s, Lawley was the regular stand-in for Terry Wogan on his BBC1 thrice-weekly chat show Wogan. From 1988 to 26 August 2006 Lawley was the presenter of Desert Island Discs on BBC Radio 4.

Other work 
In 1989, the BBC launched Lawley in her own Saturday night talk show titled Saturday Matters with Sue Lawley, which was received badly by critics and was cancelled after one series. The very first guest interviewed was the then Duchess of York, Sarah Ferguson. Lawley later left the BBC to work for ITV, but did little work for them, other than an occasional series of high-profile interviews, which included British Prime Minister John Major. She returned to BBC1 in 1993 to host the show Biteback. Lawley was later part of ITN's presenting team in its ITV Election 97 coverage.

Lawley later introduced the BBC Radio 4 Reith Lectures and was also a board member of the English Tourism Council and English National Opera. In a rare interview in 2019 for an edition of BBC Radio 4's The Reunion, looking back at pioneering women newsreaders, Lawley, then 73, confirmed to host Sue MacGregor that she is now fully retired and has no interest in any further broadcasting work.

Personal life 
Lawley was first married in 1975 to David Ashby, a solicitor. Lawley's second marriage was in 1987, to Hugh Williams, a television executive.

She was awarded the OBE in 2001.

References

External links

1946 births
Alumni of the University of Bristol
BBC newsreaders and journalists
English television talk show hosts
Living people
Officers of the Order of the British Empire
People educated at St James Academy, Dudley
People from Dudley
People from Sedgley